Irma (minor planet designation: 177 Irma) is a fairly large and dark main belt asteroid. It was discovered by the French brothers Paul Henry and Prosper Henry on November 5, 1877. Paul was credited for this discovery. The meaning of the name Irma is unknown.

Photometric observations of this asteroid at the Organ Mesa Observatory in Las Cruces, New Mexico in 2011 gave a light curve with a period of 13.856 ± 0.001 hours and a brightness variation of 0.30 ± 0.03 in magnitude.

References

External links
 
 

Background asteroids
Irma
Irma
C-type asteroids (Tholen)
Ch-type asteroids (SMASS)
18771105